Alan Oshyer (26 July 1939 – June 2002) was an Australian weightlifter. He competed in the men's featherweight event at the 1960 Summer Olympics.

References

External links
 

1939 births
2002 deaths
Australian male weightlifters
Olympic weightlifters of Australia
Weightlifters at the 1960 Summer Olympics
Sportsmen from Queensland
Commonwealth Games medallists in weightlifting
Commonwealth Games silver medallists for Australia
Weightlifters at the 1962 British Empire and Commonwealth Games
20th-century Australian people
21st-century Australian people
Medallists at the 1962 British Empire and Commonwealth Games